Zalog pri Cerkljah is a village in the Municipality of Cerklje na Gorenjskem in the Upper Carniola region of Slovenia. It includes the hamlets of Zgornji Zalog, Srednji Zalog, Spodnji Zalog, Zgornja Trata, and Spodnja Trata.

Name
The name of the settlement was changed from Zalog to Zalog pri Cerkljah in 1953. In the past the German name was Salog.

Church

The church in the hamlet of Zgornji Zalog is dedicated to Saint Matthew. The bell in the belfry is dated to 1434 and is the oldest known bell in the Archdiocese of Ljubljana.

References

External links

Zalog pri Cerkljah on Geopedia

Populated places in the Municipality of Cerklje na Gorenjskem